Preincarnate may refer to:

 Pre-existence of Christ
 Preincarnate (album), 2002 album by Bethany Joy Lenz
 Preincarnate (novel), 2010 novella by Shaun Micallef